Lanao del Sur's 2nd congressional district is a congressional district in the province of Lanao del Sur that has been represented in the House of Representatives of the Philippines since 1987. It covers 22 municipalities bordering the southern shores of Lake Lanao, including those located on the Moro Gulf coast and the municipalities bordering Maguindanao. The district is currently represented in the 18th Congress by Yasser Balindong of the Lakas–CMD.

Representation history

Election results

2019

2016

2013

2010

See also
Legislative districts of Lanao del Sur

References

Congressional districts of the Philippines
Politics of Lanao del Sur
1987 establishments in the Philippines
Congressional districts of Bangsamoro
Constituencies established in 1987